The COVID-19 pandemic in Kyrgyzstan is part of the worldwide pandemic of coronavirus disease 2019 caused by severe acute respiratory syndrome coronavirus 2. The virus was confirmed to have reached Kyrgyzstan in March 2020.

Background 
On 12 January 2020, the World Health Organization (WHO) confirmed that a novel coronavirus was the cause of a respiratory illness in a cluster of people in Wuhan City, Hubei Province, China, which was reported to the WHO on 31 December 2019.

The case fatality ratio for COVID-19 has been much lower than SARS of 2003, but the transmission has been significantly greater, with a significant total death toll.

Timeline

On 18 March 2020, the first three cases in the country were confirmed, after a citizen returned from Saudi Arabia according to the nation's health ministry, prior to the first reported case Kyrgyzstan closed its borders to foreigners. Kyrgyzstan, along with neighboring Tajikistan, Kazakhstan, and Uzbekistan have also taken measures to limit or ban large public gatherings, as well as banning Friday prayers at mosques. The health ministry also confirmed that all three suspected COVID-19 carriers were currently in quarantine. On the same day, the Prime Minister of Kyrgyzstan ruled that medical face masks being imported and exported from Kyrgyzstan would be exempt from value-added taxes.

On 20 March 2020, three new cases were reported in Nookat District, Osh Region in southern Kyrgyzstan. Those infected had also recently returned from a religious pilgrimage to Saudi Arabia. A state of emergency was declared in the district.

The government declared a one-month state of emergency starting 22 March 2020. On the same day, all public transportation ceased operation in Bishkek, with exception of trolleybuses, as a precondition measure aimed at containing the spread of the virus in the capital.

On 24 March 2020, the government issued a decree declaring the state of emergency from 25 March until 15 April in three major cities of Bishkek, Osh and Jalal-Abad, while local emergencies were declared in three provincial districts. In Bishkek, curfew was imposed from 20:00-07:00 local time, and checkpoints on the roads were established in and out of the city.

Statistics

On July 17 Kyrgyzstan government announced that COVID-19 statistics will include both positive COVID-19 cases, as well as certain pneumonia cases that show similarities to COVID-19, in the name of transparency.

Due to hospitals being overwhelmed, categorizing between COVID-19 and pneumonia deaths became impractical - making many pneumonia cases probable COVID cases.

Charts

Active cases, recoveries and deaths

New cases per day

Deaths per day

Recoveries per day

Active cases, serious cases and ICU admissions per day

New COVID-19 cases in Kyrgyzstan by region

New COVID-19 cases in Kyrgyzstan by region table (2nd wave)

References

 
coronavirus pandemic
coronavirus pandemic 
coronavirus pandemic
coronavirus pandemic 
Kyrgyzstan
Kyrgyzstan
Disease outbreaks in Kyrgyzstan